DSCR may refer to:
Debt service coverage ratio
Defense Supply Center, Richmond